Ila Kol Lli Bihibbouni (English: To All Those Who Love Me) is the eleventh studio album by Lebanese singer Elissa released by Rotana on 25 July 2018, making it her eighth album released by Rotana Records. On the first week of its release, it ranked tenth on the Billboard World Albums chart.

On 7 August 2018, Elissa released the music video for "Ila Kol Lli Bihibbouni" where in the music video, Elissa disclosed her breast cancer diagnosis in late December 2017 along with her treatment and recovery. The music video went viral and amassed more than 9 million views during its first week of release.

Track listing

Notes
"Nefsi A'ollo" is an Arabic-language cover of the 1994 Turkish song "Haydi Söyle" by İbrahim Tatlıses.

Personnel
Adapted from the album liner notes.

 Jean Nakhoul - executive producer
 Nasser El Assadd - recording, keyboard (track 16)
 Elie Barbar - recording (track 2), vocal sound engineer
 Edouard Meunier - mixing
 Tim Young - mastering
 Tamer Ghneim - strings (tracks 1, 10), strings leader (track 5, 7)
 Tarek Raouf - trumpet (track 1)
 Rocket - guitar and mandolin (track 1)
 Wael El Naggar - accordion (tracks 1, 8)
 Ahmad El Iyadi - tablah (track 1)
 Sherif Alyan - contrabass (track 1)
 Acapella - chorus (track 1)
 Mohammed Adas - strings recording (track 1), music engineer (tracks 5, 7, 10)
 Mahmoud Ezzat - music engineer (track 1)
 Alain Oueijane - guitar (tracks 2, 9, 11), electric guitar (track 15)
 Ihab Jamal - violin (tracks 2, 9)
 Hassan Saeed - strings section (track 3)
 Mostafa Aslan - guitar (tracks 3, 6, 7, 16), electric guitar (tracks 4, 7), acoustic guitar (track 10)
 Ammar Khater - sound engineer (tracks 3, 8)
 Bulant - clarinet (track 4)
 Ayhan Gunyel - acoustic guitar (track 4)
 Ali Chaker - bağlama (track 4)
 Morat - bass guitar (track 4)
 Ibrahim - duduk (track 4)
 Majd Jaride - violins group (track 4)
 Franco Lof - bass guitar (track 5)
 Mostafa Nasr - guitar (tracks 5, 8, 13)
 Fares Sakr - violin (track 5), strings (track 13)
 Hamoso - clarinet (tracks 6, 13), saxophone (tracks 6, 16)
 Ahmad Khairy - ney (track 6)
 Mohammed Atef Imam - violin (track 6), strings section leader (track 6)
 Osama Hassan - bouzouki (track 6)
 Ahmad Gouda - sound engineer (track 6)
 Ahmed Ragab - bass guitar (tracks 7, 10)
 Osama Ezz - piano (track 7)
 Diaa Badr - percussion (tracks 7, 10)
 Nadim Rouhana - accordion (track 9)
 Amr Saleh - piano (track 10)
 Hussein Kemanci - violin (track 10)
 Can Kesmez - music engineer (track 10)
 Ehab Sobhy - strings group (track 12)
 Mostafa Raouf - music engineer (tracks 13, 16)
 Mohammed Mostafa - ney (track 16)
 Mahmoud Ez El Dine - percussions (track 16)
 Matthias Clamer - photographer
 Georges Haddad - photoshoot production
 Rasha Kassab - photoshoot concept
 Yehya Chokr - hair
 Bassam Fattouh - make up
 Mandy Merheb - fashion consultant
 Rula Zuheir Baalbaki - translator

Charts

References

Elissa (singer) albums
Rotana Records albums
2018 albums